William Junior Chalmers (born January 24, 1934 - d. December 7, 1994), was a professional ice hockey player who played for the Guelph Biltmore Mad Hatters, winning the Memorial Cup in 1952 as national junior ice hockey champions of Canada, and the George Richardson Memorial Trophy as eastern Canadian champions the same year.

On November 21, 1953, the 20-year-old Chalmers played one game with the NHL's New York Rangers at Maple Leaf Gardens. This was the only NHL game of his career, earning him a spot on the list of NHL one gamers.

Beginning in 1957–58, Chalmers played the next fourteen seasons for five teams in the International Hockey League. Six of those seasons under general manager Ken Wilson, from 1960 to 1963 with the Omaha Knights and 1963 to 1966 for the Toledo Blades.

In 1982, Chalmers took over coaching duties for the Danville Dashers of the Continental Hockey League. Chick led the Dashers to a Wal-Mart Cup playoff victory in 1984.

Chalmers died on December 7, 1994.

Team awards
1951–1952 Memorial Cup
1963–1964 Turner Cup
1963–1964 Fred A. Huber Trophy
1966–1967 Turner Cup

Individual awards
1959–60 George H. Wilkinson Trophy  
1959–60 IHL Second Team All-Star
1960–1961 IHL Second Team All-Star
1961–1962 IHL First Team All-Star 
1964–1965 James Gatschene Memorial Trophy
1966–1967 IHL Second Team All-Star

Playing statistics

Coaching
 1982–1984 Danville Dashers

See also
List of players who played only one game in the NHL

External links

1934 births
1994 deaths
Canadian ice hockey centres
Canadian people of British descent
Des Moines Oak Leafs players
Greensboro Generals (EHL) players
Guelph Biltmore Mad Hatters players
Ice hockey people from Ontario
Louisville Rebels players
New York Rangers players
Omaha Knights (IHL) players
Sportspeople from Stratford, Ontario
Sault Ste. Marie Greyhounds players
Toledo Blades players
Toledo Hornets players
Troy Bruins players
Vancouver Canucks (WHL) players